Bam Dev Gautam is a Nepalese politician and the former Home Minister and Deputy Prime Minister of Nepal. A member of CPN (Unified Socialist), Gautam is a former Senior vice Chairman of Communist Party of Nepal (Unified Marxist–Leninist). He is currently member of National Assembly nominated by President.

Gautam left Communist Party of Nepal (Unified Marxist–Leninist) on 4 September 2021 and has not joined any party yet. It was reported that he may join CPN (Unified Socialist) or float a new party of his own very soon. Later Gautam wrote election song for CPN (Unified Socialist) after which he is thought to have joined CPN (Unified Socialist) internally. Although Gautam announced his own party on 28 June 2022, named Communist Party of Nepal (Unity National Campaign).

Personal life
After completing his SLC, Gautam started teaching as a profession. He is married to Tulsa Thapa who is also a Member of House of Representatives.

Political life

Early political career 
Bam dev Gautam joined the Communist party of Nepal in 1964 and participated in full-time party activities from Rupandehi District in 1969. He became District Secretary of CPN Rupandehi in 1972. He played a major role in establishing Mukti Morcha with Madan Bhandari and Jeev Raj Ashrit. He later became Central member of Communist Party of Nepal(Marxist–Leninist) in 1980. After the merger, he was made a Politburo member of CPN(UML) and also attained the position of Deputy General Secretary of the party.

He was elected MP from Bardiya Constituency No. 1 in first General Election 1991 and Mid Term Election 1994. Later he became the Deputy Prime Minister and Home Minister in February 1997.

Split of CPN (UML) and formation of CPN (ML) 
Bam Dev Gautam played a major role in splitting the CPN(UML) over the issue of Mahakali treaty with India and later formed CPN(ML) on 5 March 1998. He was elected General Secretary of the party in March of that year.

Merger to CPN (UML) 
The party failed to get a single seat in House in next election. Later, Bam Dev Gautam again joined the CPN(UML).

On 31 August 2008, Bam Dev Gautam was appointed as the Deputy Prime Minister and Home Minister in the Maoist-led Coalition Government.

In federal democratic republican Nepal 
In February 2009, Bam Dev Gautam was elected one of the vice-chairman of CPN(UML) in Butwal General Convention.

On 2 May 2010 during Maoist protests, Bam Dev Gautam called for the Prime Minister to resign to end the current political stalemate.

He was a member of the 2nd Nepalese Constituent Assembly. He won the Bardia–1 and Pyuthan-1 seat in CA assembly, 2013 from the Communist Party of Nepal (Unified Marxist–Leninist).

2017-present 
In the he was defeated by Sanjay Gautam of Nepali Congress inspire of left alliance forged between CPN (UML) and CPN (Maoist Centre). Presently, he is a member of National Assembly nominated by President on recomentadion of council of ministers.

Electoral history

2017 legislative elections

2013 Constituent Assembly election

2008 Constituent Assembly election

1999 legislative elections

1994 legislative elections

1991 legislative elections

See also 

 2021 split in Nepal Communist Party
 2021 split in Communist Party of Nepal (Unified Marxist-Leninist)
 CPN (Unity National Campaign)

References

1944 births
Living people
People from Pyuthan District
Government ministers of Nepal
Members of the National Assembly (Nepal)
Nepal Communist Party (NCP) politicians
Nepal MPs 1991–1994
Nepal MPs 1994–1999
People of the Nepalese Civil War
Deputy Prime Ministers of Nepal
Members of the 2nd Nepalese Constituent Assembly